Eidelstedt railway station is on the Hamburg-Altona–Kiel line and is served by the city trains and the commuter trains of the AKN railways plc., located in Hamburg, Germany

The railway station is located in the quarter of Eidelstedt in the Eimsbüttel borough.

Station layout
The station is an elevated island platform with 2 tracks and one exit. The station is fully accessible for handicapped persons, because there is a lift and a special floor layout for blind persons.

Station services

Trains
The commuter trains of the line A1are calling Eidelstedt as a terminus, the A1 travels toward Hamburg central station twice during the morning rush hours. The rapid transit trains of the lines S3 and S21 of the Hamburg S-Bahn are calling the station.

Direction of the trains on track 1 is toward Kaltenkirchen and Neumünster (A1), Pinneberg (S3) and Elbgaustraße railway station (S21). On track 2 the trains are running in the direction Hamburg central station  (A1 temporary), Stade (S3) and Aumühle (S21).

Facilities at the station
A small shop in the station sells fast food and newspapers. There are no lockerboxes. No personnel is attending the station, but there are SOS and information telephones, ticket machines, 20 bicycle stands and 20 parking lots.

See also
Hamburger Verkehrsverbund (HVV)

References

External links

DB station information 
Network plan HVV (pdf) 560 KiB 

Hamburg S-Bahn stations in Hamburg
Buildings and structures in Eimsbüttel
Railway stations in Germany opened in 1844
1844 establishments in Germany